The Campaspe River, an inland intermittent river of the northcentral catchment, part of the Murray-Darling basin, is located in the lower Riverina bioregion and Central Highlands and Wimmera regions of the Australian state of Victoria. The headwaters of the Campaspe River rise on the northern slopes of the Great Dividing Range and descend to flow north into the Murray River, Australia's longest river, near Echuca.

Location and features

The middle reaches of the river are dominated by Lake Eppalock, a constructed reservoir. The Coliban River, the most significant tributary of the Campaspe, also flows into Lake Eppalock. The river meets its confluence with the Murray River west of the town of Echuca, located adjacent to the state border between Victoria and New South Wales.

In addition to the Coliban River, the Campaspe River is joined by six minor tributaries and passes through the Campaspe Weir. The river descends  over its  course.

The river is crossed three times by the Calder Freeway near Kyneton, and by the McIvor Highway near Eppalock. The Midland Highway and Northern Highway duplex crosses the river at Elmore, and the Murray Valley Highway and Northern Highway duplex crosses the river at Echuca.

History
Aboriginal Australians lived in the catchment for millennia.

Europeans arrived in the upper catchment area in 1834. After European settlement, native vegetation was removed from part of the area, which was replanted with willow trees and hedgerows of hawthorn bushes, some of the latter remaining today. Over a number of years the willow growth has been progressively cleared and eradicated by local groups of volunteers. The willow-free parts of the river have been subsequently replanted with indigenous species. Walking routes and cycle tracks have been installed along one bank of the river, creating a sustainable leisure resource for the town.

Etymology
As the river is relatively long, Aboriginal peoples from various cultural groups lived near the river course. In the Yorta Yorta language, the name for the river is Yalka or Yalooka, meaning "dry leaf". In the Taungurung language the name for the river is Boregam, with no clearly defined meaning. In the Taungurung and Ngurai-illam Wurrung language, the river is named Yerrin, with no clearly defined meaning.

It was named by Major Mitchell in 1836 for Campaspe, a mistress of Alexander the Great.

See also

References

External links

North-Central catchment
Rivers of Hume (region)
Rivers of Loddon Mallee (region)
Tributaries of the Murray River
Central Highlands (Victoria)
Wimmera